The Prilutsky M1914 was a semi-automatic pistol that was designed in the Russian Empire. It was supposedly to be used by the Imperial Russian Army but it was canceled due to the start of the First World War.

External links
 https://reyfman.wordpress.com/2014/02/27/опытный-пистолет-прилуцкого-россия-1914/

Firearms of the Russian Empire
Tula Arms Plant products
Trial and research firearms of Russia
.32 ACP semi-automatic pistols
Semi-automatic pistols of Russia